Gierłoż (pronounced   (German: Görlitz in Ostpreußen) is a small village in the administrative district of Gmina Kętrzyn, within Kętrzyn County, Warmian-Masurian Voivodeship, in north-east Poland. It is located in the historic region of Masuria. The village has a population of 24.

History

In 1454 King Casimir IV Jagiellon incorporated the village and region to the Kingdom of Poland upon the request of the Prussian Confederation, and after the subsequent Thirteen Years’ War (1454–1466) it was part of Poland as a fief held by the Teutonic Knights. From the 18th century it was part of the Kingdom of Prussia, and from 1871 to 1945 it was part of Germany, administratively located in the province of East Prussia. During World War II, Adolf Hitler's military headquarters from June 21, 1941 to November 20, 1944 were situated here in a bunker, called the Wolf's Lair. After the defeat of Nazi Germany in the war, in 1945, the village along with Masuria became again part of Poland.

References

Villages in Kętrzyn County